Hapalopsittaca is a genus of Neotropical parrot native to the Andes of South America.

Species
It contains the following species:

The rusty-faced parrot, red-faced parrot and Fuertes's parrot form a superspecies complex, and have at various
times. been considered conspecific.

 
Psittacidae
Bird genera
Taxa named by Robert Ridgway
Taxonomy articles created by Polbot